Shorea obtusa, the Siamese sal, is a species of hardwood tree in the family Dipterocarpaceae, native to Southeast Asia.

Distribution and habitat
Shorea obtusa is native to Myanmar, Thailand, Cambodia, Laos, and Vietnam. It grows in relatively dry areas, often sharing the same habitat with Dipterocarpus obtusifolius, as well as oaks Quercus kerrii, Quercus kingiana, and pines, up to  altitude in Thailand.

Description
It flowers from January to July; the distinctive yellow flowers droop in clusters, with long narrow petals. It grows stunted in savannas.

Uses
As well as an export timber source, the wood is graded as first (highest) category in Cambodia. It is a very hard timber and is used to make columns, bridges, sleepers, and for other various construction purposes. Exposed in the open, it may last 10–15 years, though if indoors it may last 50–60 years. The resin, from the trunk, is used to make torches, while the bark is part of a malaria remedy. The tree is the most preferred source of firewood in some areas of Kompong Chhnang Province, Cambodia.

Conservation
Shorea obtusa has been assessed as Near Threatened on the IUCN Red List. The species is threatened by logging for timber and land conversion for agriculture. The prior assessment in 1998 had assessed the species as Least concern.

References

obtusa
Trees of Indo-China
Taxonomy articles created by Polbot